Olga Nikolaevna Rubtsova (20 August 1909 – 13 December 1994) was a Soviet chess player and the fourth women's world chess champion. In 2015, she was inducted into the World Chess Hall of Fame.

Career
Rubtsova won the Soviet Women's Championship four times (1927, 1931, 1937 and 1948). She was second in the Women's World Chess Championship 1949–50, a point behind Lyudmila Rudenko. She won the title in 1956, finishing ahead of Rudenko and Elisaveta Bykova in a tournament. Rubtsova lost it to Bykova in a match in 1958.

 In 1957, Rubtsova took part in the inaugural Women's Chess Olympiad in Emmen, the Netherlands, as a member of the USSR team, along with Kira Zvorykina. Soviet Union won the gold medal.

FIDE awarded her the titles of Woman International Master (WIM) in 1950, International Master (IM) in 1956, and Woman Grandmaster (WGM) in 1976. In 1952 she was awarded the title of Honoured Master of Sport of the URSS.

Rubtsova also played correspondence chess, and became the first women's world correspondence chess champion in 1972. She finished second in the next championship, only losing the title to Lora Jakovleva on tie-break, and fifth in the one after that. As of today, she remains the only player, male or female, to become world champion in both over-the-board and correspondence chess.

Personal life
Rubtsova graduated from the Bauman Moscow State Technical University. She was also awarded the Order of the Red Banner of Labour.

References

External links
 
 
 

1909 births
1994 deaths
Chess International Masters
Chess woman grandmasters
Chess Olympiad competitors
Sportspeople from Moscow
Soviet female chess players
Women's world chess champions
World Correspondence Chess Champions
Russian female chess players
Honoured Masters of Sport of the USSR
Bauman Moscow State Technical University alumni
Recipients of the Order of the Red Banner
Articles containing video clips
20th-century chess players